The 2019–20 Stephen F. Austin Ladyjacks basketball team represented Stephen F. Austin University during the 2019–20 NCAA Division I women's basketball season. The Ladyjacks were led by fifth year head coach Mark Kellogg and played their home games at the William R. Johnson Coliseum as members of the Southland Conference. They finished the season 23–6, 16–4 in Southland play to finish in second place. Before they could play in the Southland women's tournament however, the tournament was cancelled due to the coronavirus pandemic.

Previous season
The Ladyjacks finished the 2018–19 season 25–7, 16–2 in Southland play to finish in second place. They lost to Texas A&M–Corpus Christi in the semifinal round of the Southland women's tournament. They received an at-large bid to the WNIT where they lost in the first round to UT Arlington.

Roster

Schedule
Sources:

|-
!colspan=9 style=| Non-conference regular season

|-
!colspan=9 style=| Southland Conference regular season

|-
!colspan=9 style=| Southland Conference non-conference season

|-
!colspan=9 style=| Southland Conference regular season

|-
!colspan=12 style=| 2020 Hercules Tire Southland Basketball Tournament
|-

See also
2019–20 Stephen F. Austin Lumberjacks basketball team

References

Stephen F. Austin Ladyjacks basketball seasons
Stephen F. Austin
Stephen F. Austin Ladyjacks basketball
Stephen F. Austin Ladyjacks basketball